John Evert Van Alen (1749February 27, 1807) was an American surveyor, merchant, and politician from the U.S. state of New York. He served as a Federalist member of the United States House of Representatives.

Early life

Van Alen was born in Kinderhook in the Province of New York, the son of Adam and Mary Van Alen. After completing his studies he became a farmer.

He moved to Defreestville and continued to farm, also serving in local offices including justice of the peace. He also became involved in civil engineering and surveying.

During the American Revolution he served as a private in the 7th Regiment (Abraham Van Alstyne's) of the Albany County Militia.

In 1790, he surveyed the town of Greenbush where he later operated a general store.

Political career
He held various political office in New York, and was assistant judge for Rensselaer County in 1791. He was elected from New York's newly created 7th congressional district in 1793 and was reelected twice, serving in Congress from March 4, 1793 to March 3, 1799. He then served as a member of the New York State Assembly in 1800 and 1801.

Death and legacy
Van Alen died in Defreestville on February 27, 1807, and is interred in Bloomingrove Rural Cemetery in North Greenbush, New York. Van Alen owned slaves. According to the terms of his 1793 will, he bequeathed to his wife "my negro girl named Dinah." To his nephew Evert Van Alen, he bequeathed "my negro boy named Tom." In addition, Van Alen provided for the manumission of "my negro man named Gus, and my negro woman named Mol" immediately after the remarriage of his wife or his wife's death, whichever came first.

The John Evert Van Alen House, constructed while he was sitting in Congress at Philadelphia, is extant in Defreestville, and was listed on the National Register of Historic Places in 2004.

Family life
Van Alen married Anne Freyermoet in 1771. They had one child, Evert, a nephew whom they adopted.

References

External links

 North Greenbush Notes: John Evert Van Alen

1749 births
1807 deaths
People from Kinderhook, New York
John Evert
American people of Dutch descent
Pro-Administration Party members of the United States House of Representatives from New York (state)
Federalist Party members of the United States House of Representatives from New York (state)
Members of the New York State Assembly
New York (state) state court judges
American surveyors
American slave owners 
People from Rensselaer County, New York
New York (state) militiamen in the American Revolution
Burials in New York (state)